The Fruit Bowl was a post-season college football bowl game held in December at Kezar Stadium in San Francisco, California. The game was held three times, following the 1947-1949 seasons. The first two games featured college teams and the last involved club teams. 

The games were important due to the inclusion of schools that are considered historically black colleges and universities (HBCUs) in both the 1947 and 1948 games. The 1947 game featured two such schools,  and Prairie View  A&M. This was the first meeting of HBCUs in San Francisco. The 1948 game was the first inter-racial bowl game played in the United States. It featured Southern and San Francisco State.

Game results (college games only)

See also
 List of college bowl games

References

Defunct college football bowls
Sports competitions in San Francisco
American football in California
1947 establishments in California
1949 disestablishments in California
Recurring sporting events established in 1947
Recurring sporting events disestablished in 1949